Canton of Saint-Louis may refer to 2 administrative divisions in France:

Canton of Saint-Louis, Haut-Rhin, in Haut-Rhin department, Grand Est
Canton of Saint-Louis, Guadeloupe, in Réunion